Westboro Airport was an airfield operational in the mid-20th century in Westborough, Massachusetts.

References

Defunct airports in Massachusetts
Airports in Worcester County, Massachusetts
Buildings and structures in Westborough, Massachusetts